Bile is an urban-type settlement in Alchevsk Raion (district) in Luhansk Oblast of eastern Ukraine. Population:

Demographics
Native language distribution as of the Ukrainian Census of 2001:
 Ukrainian: 44.55%
 Russian: 55.05%
 Others: 0.23%

References

Urban-type settlements in Alchevsk Raion